Al Wajbah Fort is one of the oldest forts in Qatar. Located in the locality of Al Wajbah in Al Rayyan, it is situated 15 km west of Doha. The fort was built in 1893 and was the location of an important battle when the army of Sheikh Jassim bin Mohammed Al Thani defeated the Ottoman army in 1893. It was used as the residence of Hamad bin Abdullah Al Thani at various periods. The fort's most prominent features are its four watchtowers. It underwent restoration in the later 20th century.

See also
Battle of Al Wajbah

References

Al Rayyan
Forts in Qatar
Infrastructure completed in 1882